Special Investigations Unit or Special Investigation Unit may refer to:

 Special Investigations Unit (Ontario), a provincial police oversight agency in Canada
 CNN Special Investigations Unit, an investigative documentary on CNN
 Halton Regional Police Service's Special Investigations Unit
 Multnomah County Sheriff's Office's Special Investigations Unit
 New York State Office of Tax Enforcement's Special Investigations Unit
 S.I.U. (film), 2011 Korean action film
 Shelburne Police Service's  Special Investigations Unit
 Toronto Police Service's Special Investigations Unit
 White House Plumbers, covert White House Special Investigations Unit during the Nixon presidency

See also
 Special Investigating Unit, South African law enforcement agency
 SIU (disambiguation)
 Special Investigations Bureau (disambiguation)
 Special Investigations Division (disambiguation)
 Office of Special Investigations (disambiguation)
 Special Investigations Section (disambiguation)
 Special Investigations (disambiguation)